The National Film Award for Best Special Effects is one of the National Film Awards presented annually by the Directorate of Film Festivals, the organisation set up by Ministry of Information and Broadcasting, India. It is one of several awards presented for feature films and awarded with Rajat Kamal (Silver Lotus).

The award was instituted in 1991 at 39th National Film Awards but awarded first time at 40th National Film Awards and then awarded annually for films produced in the year across the country, in all Indian languages.  , twenty six feature films have been awarded which are made in five different languages: Tamil (ten), Hindi (seven), Telugu (six), Malayalam (two), and Kannada (one).

Winners 

Award includes 'Rajat Kamal' (Silver Lotus) and cash prize. Following are the award winners over the years:

References

External links 
 Official Page for Directorate of Film Festivals, India
 National Film Awards Archives
 National Film Awards at IMDb

Film awards for Best Visual Effects
SFX